Alejandro García Torre (born 13 January 1984 in Gijón, Asturias), known simply as Alejandro, is a Spanish professional footballer who plays for UD Llanera as a goalkeeper.

His twin brother, Jorge, was also a footballer (defender). Both began their career at local club Sporting de Gijón, and finished it with amateurs UD Llanera.

References

External links

1984 births
Living people
Spanish twins
Twin sportspeople
Spanish footballers
Footballers from Gijón
Association football goalkeepers
Segunda División players
Segunda División B players
Tercera División players
Tercera Federación players
Sporting de Gijón B players
Sporting de Gijón players
FC Cartagena footballers
SD Ponferradina players
Recreativo de Huelva players
Cádiz CF players
Racing de Santander players
Real Avilés CF footballers
Barakaldo CF footballers